Kaiser Karl is an upcoming French television series created by Isaure Pisani-Ferry, Jennifer Have, and Raphaëlle Bacqué. It stars Daniel Brühl as Karl Lagerfeld. Filming began in early March 2023, in France, Monaco, and Italy. The six-episode series will be released on Disney+.

Premise
The series will chronicle the rise of Karl Lagerfeld through the world of 1970s Parisian high fashion.

Cast
 Daniel Brühl as Karl Lagerfeld
 Théodore Pellerin as Jacques de Bascher
 Arnaud Valois as Yves Saint Laurent
 Alex Lutz as Pierre Bergé
 Agnès Jaoui as Gaby Aghion
 Sunnyi Melles as Marlene Dietrich

Production
In March 2023, it was announced that a television series around the life and career of famed fashion designer Karl Lagerfeld, was in production for the streaming service Disney+, with Daniel Brühl starring as the titular character. Also joining the cast were Théodore Pellerin as Jacques de Bascher, Arnaud Valois as Yves Saint Laurent, Alex Lutz as Pierre Bergé, Agnès Jaoui as Gaby Aghion, and Sunnyi Melles as Marlene Dietrich. Jérôme Salle would direct the episodes one, two, and six, while Audrey Estrougo would be directing the other three episodes.

Filming
Principal photography began in early March 2023, in France, Monaco, and Italy.

References

External links 
 

Upcoming television series
French television seasons
Disney+ original programming
Television series set in 1972
Television shows filmed in France
Television shows filmed in Monaco
Television shows filmed in Italy
Works based on periodical articles
French-language television shows